The Revisionists Revised is a 1978 history book by Diane Ravitch in criticism of recent "revisionist" works in the history of education that view public schooling as a conspiracy against the working class and human spontaneity. She argues that the goals of public schooling have varied throughout American history and across the country, and though there is disagreement over its intents, that working class people have depended on the school for the futures of their children.

References

External links 

 

1978 non-fiction books
English-language books
Historiography of education
History of education in the United States
Basic Books books